The Kaliopa House, a popular name for the Bulgarian "Urban lifestyle of Rousse" museum, was built in 1864. According to a legend, the house was bestowed upon the beautiful Kaliopa (born Maria Kalish), the wife of the Prussian consul Kalish, by the governor of the Danubian Vilayet, Midhat Pasha, who was in love with her.

The facade's design resembles the style of houses in Plovdiv. The frescoes at the upper floor were crafted in 1896. The exposition represents the role of Rousse as a gateway towards Europe, and the influx of European urban culture into Bulgaria at the end of the 19th and the beginning of the 20th century. Sample interior layouts are shown, of a drawing-room, a living-room, a music hall and a bedroom, with furniture from Vienna, as well as collections of urban clothing, of jewelry and other accessories, of silverware (cutlery) and china, which mark the changes present in the daily life of Rousse citizens. The first grand piano imported into Bulgaria from Vienna can be seen here.

External links 
 Ruse regional history museum
 A picture of the interior

Buildings and structures in Ruse, Bulgaria
Museums in Ruse Province
Houses in Bulgaria
Houses completed in 1864
Historic house museums in Bulgaria